Slava is a rural locality (a selo) in Zelyonopolyansky Selsoviet, Klyuchevsky District, Altai Krai, Russia, consisting of three streets. The population was 42 as of 2013.

Geography 
Slava is located 41 km northeast of Klyuchi (the district's administrative centre) by road. Zelyonaya Polyana is the nearest rural locality.

References 

Rural localities in Klyuchevsky District